Buchy is a commune in the Moselle department in Grand Est in northeastern France.

Population

See also 
 Communes of the Moselle department\

References

External links
 

Communes of Moselle (department)
Moselle communes articles needing translation from French Wikipedia